

Short history
 
On 10 January 2000, in Oradea was founded the Agora Foundation as a non profit, non governmental, non-political, independent organization, having a humanitarian and non-patrimonial purpose and it was enrolled into the Register of associations and foundations as a private juridical entity. Through the Decision taken by the General Committee of the Founding Members, on 17 March 2000, inside the Foundation was developed a private university and also the calendar of the activities that should have been followed, in order to get the authorization for the institution, and for the first programs of study.

By the Decision of the Agency for Quality Assurance in Higher Education (Romania), taken on 20 December 2010, the Agora University was accredited with the qualifier "trust“, and the proposal was transmitted to the Romanian Ministry of National Education (Romania). The proposal was transmitted to the Parliament of Romania.
After the approval of the two Chambers of the Romanian Parliament and of the Romanian president, on 3 April 2012 it was published in Romanian Official Gazette no. 222, 1st part, the Act 59/2012 regarding the establishment of Agora University of Oradea.

Founders:
 Rector of Agora University: Misu-Jan Manolescu (2000-2012);
 Dean of the Faculty of Law and Economics: Adriana Manolescu (2000-2010).

University Staff (2012-2016):
 President of Administration Council: Misu-Jan Manolescu;
 President of Senate: Adriana Manolescu;
 Rector of Agora University: Misu-Jan Manolescu;
 Dean of the Faculty of Economics: Casian Butaci;
 Dean of the Faculty of Legal and Administrative Studies: Radu-Gheorghe Florian;
 Director of Social Sciences Department: Viorina Maria Judeu;
 Director of Economic Sciences Department: Oana Mateut-Petrisor.

Faculty Legal and Administrative Sciencecs
The Bachelor's specializations (Bologna System – Cycle 1) of this faculty are:
 Law(4 years);
 Local Police (3 years).

Faculty of Economics
 Management (3 years),
 Accountability and Management Information Systems(3 years).

The Master's specialization (Bologna System – Cycle 2) of this faculty is:
 Management of Human Resources (2 years);
 Public Organisations Management (2 years);
 Criminal Sciences and Forensic (1 year).

The Postgraduate's specializations of this faculty are:
 Penal and Criminal Sciences (1 semester)
 Institutions of Work Law (1 semester)
 Institutions of Private Law (1 semester)
 Management of Human Resources (1 semester)
 Financial and Accounting Audit (1 semester)
 Public Administration/Local Police (3 years)

Publishing House
The Agora University Press is recognized by the National University Research Council and publish monographs, books, university courses and three scientific journals:
International Journal of Computers, Communications and Control (IJCCC), a scientific journal in informatics that is published from 2006 and has 4 issues per year. Every issue is published in online format and print format. It offers free online access to the full content of the journal.
International Journal of Juridical Sciences (AIJJS), is published yearly in 2007, 2008 and 2009, beginning with 2010 it is published twice a year; it includes studies that are structured on the following scientific fields: Private Law, Public Law, Criminal Sciences, Juridical Sociology, Juridical Psychology, Juridical informatics.
Agora International Journal of Economical Sciences (AIJES), is published yearly, beginning with 2007 and includes Studies that are structured on the following scientific fields: General Economic Management Marketing Tourism Accountable Finance The articles are published in English.

CCC Publications, powered by Agora University Publishing House, currently publishes IJCCC and its scope is to publish scientific literature (journals, books, monographs, and conference proceedings) in the area: Computing, Communications, Control.

International Relations
The staff is involved in international cooperation with foreign institutions, having good relationship and agreements with universities from Italy, U.S.A., France, Lithuania, Hungary.

Agora University together with The Institute of Political Studies San Pio V of Rome, Italy opened the first series of courses for the Italian residents in Romania in 2001. The program was financed by the Italian Ministry of Labor and Social Assistance.

The San Pio V University of Rome, Italy, The University of Malta and Agora University opened in 2003 The Master studies on Economical and Cultural Cooperation: "The Human Rights in The Mediterranean Region, The Ways of a Lasting Development".

References

 Instituţii de învăţământ superior particular acreditate , Ministry of National Education

External links
Official website of Agora University 
Romanian Ministry of National Education 
Romanian Agency for Quality Assurance in Higher Education 

Universities in Oradea
Educational institutions established in 2000
2000 establishments in Romania